Chionochloa is a genus of tussock grass in the family Poaceae, found primarily in New Zealand with one known species in New Guinea and another on Lord Howe Island (part of Australia). Some of the species are referred to as snowgrass.

Most of the species in the genus grow in clumps, some up to 1.5 m tall. Red tussock dominates the tall tussock grasslands on the volcanic mountains of the North Island of New Zealand and can also be found in areas on the northern half of the South Island. Snow tussock, of which there are several species, can be found above the tree line together with other species.

 Species

 formerly included
see Rytidosperma 
 Chionochloa pallida - Rytidosperma pallidum

References

 
Bunchgrasses of Australasia
Grasses of New Zealand
Poales of Australia
Poaceae genera